Going A Bundle was a Southern TV children's television series hosted by Harry Fowler and Kenny Lynch shown between 1974 and 1976 . The series also featured James Villiers and Anne Aston. Six twenty-five-minute episodes were made.

References

British children's television series
1970s British children's television series